Björn Andræ (born 14 May 1981) is a German volleyball player, a member of Germany men's national volleyball team and German club Netzhoppers KW, a participant of the Olympic Games (2008, 2012).

Career
Three times in a row he was chosen the German Volleyball Player of the Year (2004, 2005, 2006). With VfB Friedrichshafen Andrae won two titles of German Champion (2001, 2002). After few years in German and Italian clubs he went to Polish team Mlekpol AZS Olsztyn. He achieved bronze medal of 2007–08 Polish Volleyball League. Then he went to Greek Panathinaikos Athens and achieved with its silver medal in 2008–09 CEV Cup and also silver of Greek Championship. Then he came back to Italian league to represent Tonno Callipo Vibo Valentia for one season. In 2010 he started to play in Russian Superleague, from 201 to 2013 Kuzbass Kemerovo, then a few months in Ural Ufa and another season 2014/15 in the first one. In 2015 he came back to VfB Friedrichshafen and achieved silver medal of German Championship. Since 2016 he has been playing as Netzhoppers KW player.

Achievements

Clubs

CEV Cup
  2008/2009, with Panathinaikos Athens
  1998/1999, with SCC Berlin

National championships
 1999/2000  German Cup, with VfB Friedrichshafen
 2000/2001  German Cup, with VfB Friedrichshafen
 2000/2001  German Championship, with VfB Friedrichshafen
 2001/2002  German Cup, with VfB Friedrichshafen
 2001/2002  German Championship, with VfB Friedrichshafen
 2002/2003  German Cup, with VfB Friedrichshafen
 2007/2008  Polish Championship, with Mlekpol AZS Olsztyn
 2008/2009  Greek Championship, with Panathinaikos Athens
 2015/2016  German Championship, with VfB Friedrichshafen

Individual
 2004 European League – Best Server
 2004 German Volleyball Player of the Year
 2005 German Volleyball Player of the Year
 2006 German Volleyball Player of the Year

References

External links
 
 
 
 
 

1981 births
Living people
German men's volleyball players
AZS Olsztyn players
Volleyball players from Berlin
Volleyball players at the 2008 Summer Olympics
Volleyball players at the 2012 Summer Olympics
Olympic volleyball players of Germany
Expatriate volleyball players in Poland
Panathinaikos V.C. players
Ural Ufa volleyball players
21st-century German people